Mari Kim is a South Korean contemporary artist from Seoul, South Korea. She is known for the big-eyed, cartoon-like female characters in her pop art paintings, called "eyedolls". Her work was popularly recognized after her 2011 collaboration with the K-pop girl group 2NE1, directing the animated music video for their single "Hate You". The single topped charts and the music video, with eyedoll action heroines portraying each of the four members, received over twenty million YouTube views.

Life and career
Kim was born in Busan as Kim Mari. Due to her father's job, the family moved often and she became close to her younger brother, Nara, as friendships were hard to maintain with the relocating. She consoled herself with crayons, drawing "everything and anything" and found her passion for art. She said, "I always liked fantasizing as a child."

During high school she read a lot of teen novels and comics. As her interest in art developed, she was unsure of making it a career.  Her parents had artistic interests in photography, sketching and embroidery but hoped that she would pursue medicine or law.  They compromised when she found a course of studies in visual arts through computers. After high school, she moved to Melbourne, Australia, and attended RMIT University where she received a master's degree in multimedia design and creative media in 2006, after which she specialized in digital art.

She developed a love of Australia and stayed there for about a decade, along with her brother. She eventually returned to Seoul seeking an urban art scene in a familiar place.

In addition to her art work, she has been an adjunct professor for Catholic University of Korea since 2007.

Style and works

Animation
At RMIT she concentrated in animation, learning storytelling techniques, drawing, image and video creation and editing, which she incorporates in her private exhibits to enhance her flat surface works with images, videos and installation works. Movie directors that have inspired her are David Lynch, Shinya Tsukamoto, Sion Sono, Coen brothers, Lars von Trier, and The Wachowskis.

Eyedolls
In 2007, she started working with characters called "eyedolls", and during the 2015 "SETI" exhibit in Seoul, Kwon Mee-yoo of The Korea Times described them as "girls with large eyes and immature physiques [staring] from the canvas", with "funky colors and cute costumes". Her work is anime inspired, and of the large eyes, she has said "No matter if you're from the East or West, the eyes are the windows to your mind. I use the eyes as a wormhole; a gate to an imaginary and reality world."

Many of her works with the eyedolls include fairy tale and other popular characters and famous female icons, including Iron Lady, Catwoman, Wonder Woman, Audrey Hepburn, and Gloria Steinem. The Untitled Magazine said the characters' eyes "encompass a world of their own" and reveal "intricate patterns", somewhat like "looking through the lens of a kaleidoscope". Some of the depictions show women with cuts or stitched lips; Kim has cited American horror films as an influence on her work.

2NE1 collaboration
In 2011, she was invited to collaborate with girl group 2NE1 on the music video for their song "Hate You" and album 2NE1, after the CEO of YG Entertainment purchased some of her paintings at an art exhibit. She worked on the planning process of the album and provided the artwork for the album cover. She produced and directed the animated music video for "Hate You", which depicts the members of the group carrying guns and saving the world from a monster, with her signature huge eyes and thick makeup.

Femininity
She has participated in several exhibitions that explore femininity, particularly in contemporary Korea.  In New York City, in 2013, Amalgamated Gallery curator Gary Krimershmoys said of the "K- Surrogates" show from September through November, "The concept for the show came from a desire to show in America a unique Korean cultural and artistic vision, that does not conform to an international orthodoxy," and added, "These three female artists embodied a connection with this particular moment in Korea, where technology, an international K-pop explosion and a neo-feminist attitude are all intermixed to produce exceptional art."

In October 2015, she joined other women artists for The Untitled Magazine's exhibit "The "F” Word: Feminism in Art", an exhibit of twenty women artists in Tribeca, described as "each artist individually [addressing] concepts revolving around feminism with works that either challenge gender stereotypes or embrace female empowerment, with literal or metaphorical visual language."

At the 2016 Los Angeles Art Show her solo exhibit "Days of Future Past" showed works that portrayed a discussion of changing gender roles in Korea, including the traditional effects of Confucianism and the new generation that is "free to pursue their dreams regardless of gender".

Awards and recognition
In October 2013, she was awarded the "ChungKang Culture Award", sponsored by the Ministry of Culture, Sports and Tourism for recognition of creative work as an artist that contributed to the culture industry. Her interpretations of the stereotypical image of women in the media were noted for recreating distinctive images of women, which had also appeared in stationery or shoes that were popular among the younger generation.

Her idol eyedoll artwork was featured in the 2014 film Tazza: The Hidden Card.

Solo exhibitions
2008: "Sugar Candy Show", Ssamzie Illu-pop Gallery, Seoul
2009: "EYEDOLL SHOW", LVS Gallery, Seoul
2010: "A story about Anderson", Seo Kang University Mary Hall, Seoul
2010: "Big Head Show" Daegu, The Omni show room, Daegu
2011: "Child Play", Television 12 Gallery, Seoul
2012: "Famous Show in Dubai", Opera Gallery, Dubai, UAE
2012: "Famous Show in Busan", Gana Art Gallery, Busan
2012: "Famous Show", Gana Art Gallery, Seoul
2013: "The Premiere U.S. solo exhibition of Korean artist Mari Kim", Art Aqua Art Miami,
2013: "Famous Show in Hong Kong", LCX Hourbor city, Hong Kong
2014: "Synchronicity", Shine Artists Gallery, London, UK
2014: "Famous Show in Berlin", JR Gallery, Berlin, Germany
2014: "Famous Eyedoll", AP Contemporary Gallery, Hong Kong
2015: "Romance in the age of chaos", JR Gallery, Berlin, Germany
2015: "Forgotten Promises", Hakgojae Gallery, Shanghai, China
2016: "Synchronicity", Wynwood, Miami, US
2016: "Days of Future Past Exhibition", London, UK
2016: "Days of Future Past Exhibition", Los Angeles Art Show, Los Angeles, US  
2016: "SETI", Hakgojae Gallery, Seoul.

Selected group exhibitions
2006: "Pictoplasma Art Festival", Berlin, Germany
2008: "ART IDOL", Gallery Seo Ho, Seoul
2008: "Seoul Design Olympic Exhibition", Seoul
2008:  Busan International Film Festival selection, Busan
2009: "Korean Neo Pop", Gangnam Media Pole, Seoul
2009: "Hello Funnism", Shin Han Gallery, Seoul
2009: "Beauty Rescues the World", Ssamzie Gallery, Seoul
2009: "Fun, K & Gallery", Seoul
2009: "Science Meets the Art", KAIST Gallery, Seoul
2009: "Korean Cartoon 100 years", National Museum of Modern and Contemporary Art, Seoul
2010: "IROBOT", Cho Sun Gallery, Seoul
2010: "Pop Party", Jangheung Art Park, Jangheung
2010: "Byul Collection Now", Gallery Hyundai K-Auction, Seoul
2010: "Decem Satisfaction", Gallery LEEBE, Busan
2010: "Korean Contemporary Art 3-Pop Art", Kimhae Art Centre, Kimhae
2010: "Korean 50 Contemporary Artists", Gyeonggi Arts Centre, Suwon
2010: "Wow~! Funny Pop", Gyeongnam Art Museum, Changwon
2010: "Korean Pop Art", Art Seasons Gallery, Singapore
2011: "Black & White", Opera Gallery, Seoul
2011: "Character Logue", Jangheung Art Park, Jangheung
2011: "Fun & Toy", Gana Art Gallery, Busan
2011: "Clio Box", Insa Art Center, Seoul
2011: "Imagination Virus", Jeonnam Art Museum, Gokseong
2011: "A Fantastic Place", Pyo Gallery South, Seoul
2012: "Festival O! Gwangju international Media Art 2012", Gwangju
2012: "Cartoon World", SOMA Museum of Art, Seoul
2012: "My Funny Valentine", KimReeA Gallery, Seoul
2012: "Dragon in your room", Atelier Aki, Seoul
2013: "K- Surrogates", Amalgamated Gallery, New York City, USA
2013: "Korean Collective", Shine Artists & Albemarle Gallery, London, UK
2013: "Sub Express 2013", Culture Station, Seoul
2013: "GANA 30TH ANNIVERSARY CELEBRATION EXHIBITION", Gana Art, Seoul
2015: "Autumn Contemporary Collection", Shine Artists, London, UK

Other projects
2007: Directed the short film "Religulous", selected in the Mains d'Oeuvres Festival, Saint-Ouen, France
2011: Produced and directed the music video for 2NE1's "Hate You"
2011: Art direction and cover artwork for 2NE1's second mini album

Collections
 Seoul Museum of Art, Seoul
 Gyeongnam Art Museum, Changwon
 Korea Advanced Institute of Science and Technology, Daejeon

Publications
 "EYEDOLL(아이돌) 마리킴의 기묘한 만화경" (2008),

Awards
 2013 Women of the Year Awards, sponsored by Ministry of Culture, Sports and Tourism, winner "ChungKang Culture Award", pop artist

References

External links

 

Artists from Seoul
South Korean women artists
South Korean contemporary artists
South Korean animators
South Korean animated film  directors
South Korean women animators
RMIT University alumni
Living people
Year of birth missing (living people)